Paracles toulgoeti is a moth of the subfamily Arctiinae first described by Watson and Goodger in 1986 found in Brazil.

References

Moths described in 1986
Paracles